Since the beginning of the British science fiction television series Doctor Who in 1963, many actors have played the title character of the Doctor on television and in various BBC-licensed spin-offs on television, stage, radio, film, audio plays, and webcasts. The character's ability to periodically regenerate appearance and personality has facilitated the ability of new actors to take over the role – in official and unofficial productions – while in most cases maintaining continuity with the television series. 

The incumbent is David Tennant, who succeeded Jodie Whittaker in the role at the conclusion of the 2022 episode "The Power of the Doctor". In May 2022, Ncuti Gatwa was announced as the next series lead to portray the Doctor.

Television

Series leads

Other

Film

Webcast

Theatre

Audio

Official comedies

See also
List of actors considered for the part of the Doctor
Doctor Who spoofs
The "Morbius Doctors"

Notes

References

Doctor, The

Actors who have played the Doctor